Jimmy Hobday is a former English international lawn and indoor bowler.

Bowls career

World Championships
Hobday won double gold in the triples at the 1980 World Outdoor Bowls Championship in Melbourne with Tony Allcock and David Bryant and the team event (Leonard Cup).

Commonwealth Games
He represented England in the fours, at the 1982 Commonwealth Games in Brisbane, Queensland, Australia.

National
Hobday was an international from 1977 until 1984 and won the 1976 Junior Singles Championship at the National Championships.

He bowled for both Wiltshire and Hampshire, the latter for the Boscombe Cliff BC.

References

Living people
English male bowls players
Bowls World Champions
1951 births
Bowls players at the 1982 Commonwealth Games
Commonwealth Games competitors for England